"Timber" is a song by American rapper Pitbull featuring American singer Kesha. The song was released on October 7, 2013, as the lead single from Pitbull's extended play (EP) Meltdown EP. The song was produced by Dr. Luke, Cirkut, and Sermstyle, with additional production by Nick Seeley. The song interpolates Lee Oskar's 1978 single "San Francisco Bay" and features harmonica player Paul Harrington, who plays through the entire song and was told to emulate Oskar.

The song was the 90th-most popular song of the decade according to Billboard. It peaked at number one on the US Billboard Hot 100 for three consecutive weeks. It also topped the charts in over fifteen additional countries. According to the IFPI, the song sold 9.6 million units worldwide in 2014, including single-track downloads and track-equivalent streams, becoming the sixth best-selling song of that year. It was certified fifteen-times Platinum in Norway, diamond in the US and Germany, seven-times Platinum in Australia and Canada, and Gold or higher in fourteen additional countries.

Background and composition
Kesha had previously featured Pitbull on remixes of her songs "Tik Tok" and "Crazy Kids", and Pitbull has featured Kesha on a 2009 song, "Girls". In an interview in December 2013, Pitbull said that Rihanna was originally meant to be the featured artist on "Timber", but she had already been asked to be the featured artist on Shakira's "Can't Remember to Forget You" and did not have time to record "Timber".

"Timber" is a dance-pop, EDM and folktronica song with elements of country. According to the sheet music published at Musicnotes.com by Kobalt Music Publishing, the song is set in common time with a moderately fast tempo of 130 beats per minute. The song is written in the key of G minor and follows a chord sequence of Gm–B–F–E. Kesha's vocals span from G♯3 to D♯5.

Paul Harrington, who plays the harmonica throughout the track, was initially given a flat fee of $1,000 for his services. Three years later, however, after consulting an expert on music law, Harrington was paid a further $50,000.

Chart performance
"Timber" made its first chart appearance on October 10, 2013, in the Republic of Ireland, where it debuted at number 67 on the Irish Singles Chart. The following week, the song climbed to number 19. In Austria, "Timber" debuted at number 69 on the Austrian Singles Chart on October 18, 2013, and eventually crowned the chart at number one. In Germany, the song debuted at number 90 on October 18, 2013, on the German Singles Chart and later peaked at number one.

Timber debuted at number 49 on the US Billboard Hot 100 on October 26, 2013. On January 18, 2014, the single reached number one on the chart, giving Kesha her third number-one single and her ninth and last top ten hit. As well as earning Pitbull his second number-one single and ninth top ten hit. Before topping the Hot 100, it had been stuck at number two for four weeks, behind "The Monster" by Eminem featuring Rihanna. "Timber" is also Kesha's eleventh top ten song on the Hot 100 chart. It also peaked at number one on the US Digital Songs chart, selling 442,000 copies in its peak week, constituting the fourth largest single week sum of 2013. It is also Pitbull's first song to do so. "Timber" also peaked at number one on the US Hot Rap Songs chart. It was the first number one single of 2014 in the US, and stayed at number one for three consecutive weeks. In May 2014, the single reached its 4 million sales mark. As of March 2016, the single has sold 4.7 million copies in the US. On June 23, 2022, the song was certified diamond by the Recording Industry Association of America (RIAA) for combined sales and streaming equivalent units of ten million in the United States, making it both Kesha's and Pitbull's first diamond certified single in the country.

In Canada, the song debuted at number seventeen on the Canadian Hot 100 as the week's highest debut and climbed steadily to number one, where it has stood for eight consecutive weeks.

In the United Kingdom, "Timber" debuted at the top of the UK Singles Chart on January 5, 2014 ― for the week ending date January 11, 2014 ― shifting 139,000 copies in its first week. This gave both artists their third chart-topping songs in Britain. By the end of 2014, the song had sold 744,000 copies in the UK.

In South Korea, "Timber" debuted at number 16 on Gaon International Chart, but it debuted at number 13 on Gaon Download International Chart with 6,522 downloads. In its second week it reached number two on the International Chart. On the download chart, it jumped to number three, selling another 15,276 copies.
"Timber" sold 68,321 copies during 2013 in South Korea. During January 2014, the single sold another 16,515 copies, and during February sold 15,482 digital units. During March 2014, another 13,975 units were sold in South Korea. According to the IFPI, the song sold 9.6 million units worldwide in 2014, including single-track downloads and track-equivalent streams, becoming the sixth best-selling song of that year.

Music video
Kesha filmed her scenes on November 5, 2013, while Pitbull filmed his scenes one week later on November 12, 2013. The video also features a cameo by Italian model Raffaella Modugno and The Bloody Jug Band, an Orlando-based Americana Group, who perform on stage as the bar's house band. The beach scenes were filmed in Exuma islands, Bahamas.

The music video has over 1.3 billion views on YouTube as of August 2021, making it his most viewed video as a lead artist.

Controversy
The song's lyrical content itself was considered controversial. On June 25, 2014, it was reported that songwriters Lee Oskar, Keri Oskar, and Greg Errico had filed a copyright infringement lawsuit against the makers of "Timber", which features a harmonica melody that Oskar claims is "identical" to the melody used in his 1978 song "San Francisco Bay". The songwriters were seeking $3 million USD in damages. 

The lawsuit alleged that while Sony Music may have obtained permission to use the sample, which is credited in the album notes for Meltdown, from a license holder, the label failed to obtain permission from the songwriters themselves.

Track listing
Digital download
"Timber" (featuring Kesha) – 3:24

CD single
"Timber" (featuring Kesha) – 3:24
"Outta Nowhere" (featuring Danny Mercer) – 3:26

Credits and personnel
Recording
Engineered in Tokyo, Japan, and at APG Studios, Hollywood, California; Conway Recording Studios, Hollywood, California; Luke's in the Boo, Malibu, California; Jungle City Studios, New York City, and Blackbird Recording Studios, Nashville, Tennessee

Personnel

Armando C. Pérez – songwriter, vocals
Kesha Sebert – songwriter, vocals
Dr. Luke – songwriter, producer, instruments, programming
Priscilla Hamilton – songwriter
Jamie Sanderson – songwriter
Breyan Isaac – songwriter
Cirkut – songwriter, producer, instruments, programming
Aaron "AD" Arnold – songwriter
Pebe Sebert – songwriter
Lee Oskar – songwriter
Keri Oskar – songwriter
Greg Errico – songwriter
Sermstyle – producer

Nick Seeley – additional production
Al Burna – engineer
Rachel Findlen – engineer
Clint Gibbs – engineer
Benny Steele – engineer
Ryan Gladieux – engineer
Juan P. Negrete – engineer
Alan Da Fonseca – engineer
Ernesto Olivera – engineer
Eric Eylands – assistant engineer
Paul Harrington – harmonica
Serban Ghenea – mixer
John Hanes – engineer for mix

Credits adapted from the liner notes on BMI.

Charts

Weekly charts

Year-end charts

Decade-end charts

Certifications and sales

Release history

See also
 List of Billboard Hot 100 number ones of 2014
 List of Billboard Dance Club Songs number ones of 2014
 List of number-one dance singles of 2014 (Australia)
 List of number-one singles of 2014 (South Africa)

References

External links

Timber on Spotify

2013 singles
2013 songs
Billboard Hot 100 number-one singles
Canadian Hot 100 number-one singles
Dutch Top 40 number-one singles
Folktronica songs
Kesha songs
Mega Top 50 number-one singles
Number-one singles in Austria
Number-one singles in Denmark
Number-one singles in Finland
Number-one singles in Germany
Number-one singles in Israel
Number-one singles in Norway
Number-one singles in Scotland
Number-one singles in Sweden
Pitbull (rapper) songs
RCA Records singles
Record Report Pop Rock General number-one singles
Sampling controversies
Song recordings produced by Cirkut (record producer)
Song recordings produced by Dr. Luke
Songs written by Breyan Isaac
Songs written by Cirkut (record producer)
Songs written by Dr. Luke
Songs written by Kesha
Songs written by Pebe Sebert
Songs written by Pitbull (rapper)
Songs written by Muni Long
Songs written by Sermstyle
South African Airplay Chart number-one singles
UK Singles Chart number-one singles